Kyle Newman (born March 16, 1976) is an American filmmaker, actor and New York Times bestselling author. He is known for directing Fanboys, a Star Wars-themed comedy, Barely Lethal starring Hailee Steinfeld and Samuel L. Jackson for A24 and 
1Up starring Ruby Rose, a comedy set in the world of competitive esports, for Lionsgate and Prime Video.

He has directed music videos for Taylor Swift ("Style") ("Clean") and Lana Del Rey ("Summertime Sadness") and created the video content for Taylor Swift's The 1989 World Tour featuring Lena Dunham, Cara Delevingne, Selena Gomez and more. In 1998, Newman's short film Bitten by Love won the Coca-Cola Refreshing Filmmaker's Award.

In 2016, Newman produced the critically acclaimed documentary Raiders!: The Story of the Greatest Fan Film Ever Made, about three teenagers who set out to recreate Steven Spielberg's classic Raiders of the Lost Ark shot-for-shot in 1982, which was distributed by Drafthouse Films. He is the co-creator, co-story writer of the Netflix Original animated feature film Gnome Alone. Newman also Executive Produced Happily (film) alongside Jack Black.

2018 saw the release of his first book Dungeons & Dragons Art & Arcana: A Visual History via Ten Speed Press/ Penguin Random House in association with Wizards of the Coast. It received nominations for a Locus Award, a Diana Jones Award, and a Hugo Award. Newman's latest book Heroes' Feast: The Official Dungeons & Dragons Cookbook published in October 2020 by Ten Speed Press/ Penguin Random House in association with Wizards of the Coast, reunited the author team.

Newman, an honors graduate of New York University's School of Film/TV, and receipt of the Martin Scorsese Award for "Excellence in Directing" has written and/or directed for clients including Microsoft, Interscope Records, Starz Entertainment, The Coca-Cola Company, Starwars.com, Entertainment Weekly, Big Machine Records, Pacific Life Insurance, Games For Windows, Hasbro, Titan Publishing, Universal Republic Records, BuzzFeed, Saturday Group, Wizards of the Coast, Twentieth Century Fox, Endemol Shine, A24 Films, AwesomenessTV, Hooters of America and Lucasfilm, Ltd.

Personal life 
In March 2006, while working on the set of Fanboys, he met actress and former model Jaime King. Newman proposed in spring 2007, and the two married on November 23, 2007 in an "intimate and relaxed" ceremony in Los Angeles at Greystone Park and Manor, where Newman had proposed.

Their first son was born on October 6, 2013. In February 2015, it was announced King was pregnant with the couple's second child. King gave birth to their second son on July 16, 2015. Taylor Swift is his godmother. 

In May 2020, King filed for divorce from Newman after 13 years of marriage. King also filed a domestic violence prevention petition and was granted a temporary restraining order against Newman which was subsequently dismissed.

Kyle's brother, Kevin Newman, is a character designer for The Simpsons.

Kyle, born in New Jersey, is a devout supporter of Arsenal Football Club in England.

On February 17, 2021, a son, Etienne Noel Newman, was born to Newman and his partner, singer-songwriter Cyn.

Filmography

Director, producer, screenwriter, editor, author

Actor

References

External links

2009 interview with Bullz-Eye.com

American male film actors
American male screenwriters
People from Morristown, New Jersey
Male actors from New Jersey
1976 births
Living people
Tisch School of the Arts alumni
Film directors from New Jersey
American film editors
Comedy film directors